Football in American Samoa have entered association football competitions (OFC Champions League).

The Oceania Club Championship began in 1987, but there was no American Samoan representative during that inaugural season as reigning champions Konica Machine entered in 1999. Currently, American Samoan clubs have only played in the OFC Champions League.

Full Oceania record for American Samoan clubs

Performance record and ranking of FFAS Senior League clubs in OFC Champions League

Performance summary
The OFC Champions League (previously known as the Oceania Club Championship) is a seasonal club football competition organized by the Oceania Football Confederation (OFC) since 1987 for the most successful football clubs in Oceania.

As of the end of the 2019 OFC Champions League season, American Samoan clubs have entered the group stage twice and the preliminary round five times leaving no club advancing from these stages. The first representative for American Samoa in the Oceania Club Championship was Konica Machine in 1999 starting from the group stage and did not advance.

Early years: 1987–2005
The 1987 competition brought no American Samoan team to play in that tournament. As champions of the ASFA Soccer League in 1999, Konica Machine became the first American Samoan representative in the Oceania Club Championship. They played their first Oceania match against Malaita Eagles resulting in a 14–2 loss. Two days later, they found them eliminated by Australian club South Melbourne in a 10–0 loss.

Lack of group stage entrants: 2005–present
Since the 2006 Oceania Club Championship, no American Samoan representatives entered for seven consecutive tournaments until Pago Youth qualified for the preliminary round of the 2012–13 OFC Champions League. In the 2017 edition, a new qualifying stage was formed as Utulei Youth was the first American Samoan team to qualify for the qualifying stage, as Pago Youth entered back-to-back qualifying stages. On 17 December 2019, the OFC announced that Pago Youth had withdrawn from the qualifying stage due to concerns about the measles outbreak in the Pacific. The next tournament of the 2021 edition was also unavailable for a qualifying spot with the tournament cancelled due to the COVID-19 pandemic.

References

Oceanian football clubs in international competitions